Apex is a town in Wake County, North Carolina, United States.  At its southern border, Apex encompasses the community of Friendship. In 1994, the downtown area was designated a historic district, and the Apex train depot, built in 1867, is designated a Wake County landmark. The depot location marks the highest point on the old Chatham Railroad, hence the town's name. The town motto is "The Peak of Good Living".

In the precolonial era, the town's area was inhabited by the Tuscarora tribe of Native Americans. In the late 19th century, a small community developed around the railroad station. The forests were cleared for farmland, much of which was dedicated to tobacco farming. Since Apex was near the state capital, it became a trading center. The railroad shipped products such as lumber, tar, and tobacco. The town was officially incorporated in 1873. By 1900, the town had a population of 349. As of the 2020 census, its population was 58,780.

The population boom occurred primarily in the late 1990s. The Research Triangle Park, established in the 1960s, created strong demand for technology workers. This also drove population growth.  Apex is currently the 18th-largest municipality in North Carolina.

In 2015, Apex was named the number-one place to live in America, according to Money magazine.

Geography 
The town is a suburb of both Raleigh and Research Triangle Park (RTP). It is situated to the southwest of Raleigh with direct highway access via US 1. Apex is south of RTP with direct highway access via NC 540. Apex crests the watersheds of both the Neuse and Cape Fear Rivers. Neighboring towns include Cary to the north and northeast, Holly Springs to the south, and Raleigh to the east and northeast.

Climate

History

The town of Apex was incorporated in 1873. According to the North Carolina History Project, the town was named for its location as the highest point on a portion of the Chatham Railroad, which ultimately extends between Richmond, Virginia, and Jacksonville, Florida. According to a 1905 USGS publication on place names, the name refers to the highest point between Raleigh and the Deep River.

Apex grew slowly through the succeeding decades, despite several devastating fires, including a 12 June 1911 conflagration that destroyed most of the downtown business district. The town center was rebuilt and stands to this day, now one of the most intact railroad towns in the state. At the heart of town stands the Apex Union Depot, originally a passenger station for the Seaboard Air Line Railroad and later home to the locally supported Apex Community Library. The depot now houses the Apex Chamber of Commerce.

Apex suffered mild setbacks during the Great Depression era, but growth began again in earnest in the 1950s. The town's proximity to RTP spurred additional residential development, yet the town managed to preserve its small-town character. During the 1990s, the town's population quadrupled to over 20,000, placing new demands upon Apex's infrastructure.

Apex has continued to grow in recent years. A sizable shopping center was built at the intersection of Highway 55 and US 64, and several new neighborhoods have been built as the town grows toward the west.

In October 2006, a chemical explosion and fire in a waste-processing facility prompted one of the largest evacuations in U.S. history. There were few serious injuries, and residents were soon able to return home. In 2009, a federal court approved a $7.85M settlement to compensate Apex residents affected by the disaster. Each household received $750. Businesses received $2,200.

In addition to the Apex Union Depot, the Apex City Hall, Apex Historic District, Calvin Wray Lawrence House, and Utley-Council House are listed on the National Register of Historic Places.

Government
Apex's council-manager form of government has a mayor and five council members (one of whom serves as mayor pro tem), who are each elected at-large in staggered four-year terms. The town's attorney and manager serve at the pleasure of the council.  All the other staff report to the town manager and manage the town's day-to-day business.

The town is led by Mayor Jacques K. Gilbert, elected in 2019. The council members, in order of tenure, are: Brett D. Gantt (2017), Audra M. Killingsworth (2017), Terry J. Mahaffey (2019), Ed Gray (2021), and Arno Zegerman (2023).

In the North Carolina House of Representatives, Apex is represented by Julie von Haefen (District 36), Erin Paré (District 37), and Gale Adcock (District 41). In the North Carolina Senate, Apex is represented by Sydney Batch (District 17). In the United States House of Representatives Apex is represented by Deborah Ross (NC-02) and Wiley Nickel (NC-13).

Demographics

2020 census

As of the 2020 United States census, 58,780 people, 18,197 households, and 14,027 families reside in the town.

2010 census
As of the census of 2010, 37,476 people, 13,225 households, and 9,959 families resided in the town. The population density was 2,437.9 people per square mile. The 13,922 housing units had an average density of 905.8 per square mile. The racial makeup of the town was 69% White, 7% African American, 12% Asian, 3% from other races, and 9% from two or more races. Hispanics or Latinos of any race were 8% of the population.

Of the 18,197 total households, 14,027 (77%) were family households, of which 46% had children under 18 living with them, 63% of the family households were married couples living together, and 11% had a female householder with no husband, 4,170 households were not families, comprising 23% of total households. The average household size was 3.12, and the average family size was 2.81.

Economy

Top employers
According to the 2020 Comprehensive Financial Report for Apex, these were the town's top employers:

Schools 
Apex's public schools are operated by the Wake County Public School System.

Over 4,000 students are enrolled in two public high schools in Apex, Apex Friendship High School and Apex High School.

Public middle schools include:
 Apex Friendship Middle School
 Apex Middle School
 Lufkin Road Middle School
 Salem Middle School

Public elementary schools include:
 Apex Elementary School
 Apex Friendship Elementary School
 Baucom Elementary School
 Laurel Park Elementary School
 Olive Chapel Elementary School
 Salem Elementary School
 Scotts Ridge Elementary School

Private schools:
 Peace Montessori School
 St. Mary Magdalene Catholic School
 Thales Academy of Apex

Charter schools:
 Peak Charter Academy
 The Math and Science Academy of Apex

Infrastructure

Transportation

Roads 
This is a partially completed loop road around the greater Raleigh area.
 The Apex Peakway' is a loop road orbiting downtown Apex. The peakway was conceived as a means to relieve traffic in the downtown area and provide a bypass for commuters traveling from one side of the town to the other. It is currently the only "peakway" in North Carolina, taking its name from Apex's town motto: "The Peak of Good Living."

Transit 
 Rail:Apex is not served directly by passenger trains. Amtrak serves the nearby municipalities of Cary and Raleigh. CSX manages a freight train switch yard in the center of Apex.
 Bus: The Triangle Transit Authority branded as GoTriangle operates buses that serve the region and connect to municipal bus systems in Raleigh, Durham, and Chapel Hill. Greyhound has terminals in Raleigh and Durham. In 2022, GoTriangle launched its first Apex branded bus service, GoApex. GoCary also operates an express route that connects the two communities.

Bicycle
  U.S. Bicycle Route 1 routes through downtown Apex.
  North Carolina Bicycle Route 5 connects Apex to Wilmington and closely parallels the NCBC Randonneurs 600 kilometer brevet route.
There are numerous greenway trails including the Beaver Creek Trail and the American Tobacco Trail popular with cyclists.

Utilities 
Apex Utilities provides water/sewer, electricity, garbage, recycling, and yard waste pickup. Natural Gas is provided by PSNC.

Health care 
Emergency, primary, and specialist care is provided at the WakeMed Apex Healthplex.

Fire 
Fire protection is provided by the Apex Fire Department operating from five stations with a sixth under construction.

Police 
Police service is provided by the Apex Police Department.

Parks and recreation 
The Apex Parks, Recreation & Cultural Resources department manages many parks, greenways, and sport programs, including a skate park near downtown.

Major parks include:
 Apex Community Park
 Apex Jaycee Park
 Hunter Street Park & Trackside Skate Plaza
 Kelly Road Park
 Nature Park & Seymour Athletic Fields
 Salem Pond Park
 Pleasant Park, which is in development and for which land has already been bought, is scheduled to open in Fall of 2022.
There are both youth and adult sport programs: 
 Baseball
 Basketball
 Lacrosse
 Soccer
 Softball
 Tennis
 Volleyball

Arts and culture 
 Apex PeakFest is the community's annual festival held on the first Saturday in May. The downtown area is closed off and over 200 vendors provide food, arts & crafts, rides, and other entertainment.
 The Halle Cultural Arts Center provides a theater, classroom, and gallery spaces. It was built as the Town Hall in 1912.

Notable people 
 Wes Durham, sportscaster
 Tim Federowicz, MLB player
 Seth Frankoff, MLB player
 Randi Griffin, ice hockey player who competed in the 2018 Winter Olympics as part of the Unified Korea women's national team
 Susan Higginbotham, American historical fiction author and attorney
 C. J. Hunter, 1999 World Champion shot putter and later coach
 Justin Jedlica, known as the Human Ken Doll
 Brendan Lambe, USL player for Atlanta United 2
 Matt Mangini, former MLB player for the Seattle Mariners
 Sio Moore, former NFL player for the Oakland Raiders, Indianapolis Colts, Kansas City Chiefs, and Arizona Cardinals 
 Landon Powell, former MLB player for the Oakland Athletics
 Julia Montgomery Street, American poet, playwright and author
 William Wynn, NFL defensive end

See also 
 List of municipalities in North Carolina

References

External links

 
 
 Apex Chamber of Commerce

 
Towns in North Carolina
Towns in Wake County, North Carolina
Populated places established in 1873
1873 establishments in North Carolina